The U.S. state of Vermont currently has one congressional district, whose representative in the United States House of Representatives is elected statewide at-large.  At one time, however, it had as many as six districts.

Current district and representative

Obsolete districts 
, obsolete since reapportionment after the 1930 census
, obsolete since reapportionment after the 1930 census
, obsolete since reapportionment after the 1880 census
, obsolete since reapportionment after the 1850 census
, obsolete since reapportionment after the 1840 census
,  only used from 1821 to 1823, and obsolete since reapportionment after the 1820 census

References